Permal is a surname. Notable people with the surname include: 

Cédric Permal (born 1991), Mauritian footballer 
John Permal (1946–2019), Pakistani sprinter
Jonathan Permal (born 1994), Mauritian track and field athlete
Manav Permal (born 1999), Fijian footballer

See also
Ermal